Active United States military aircraft is a list of military aircraft that are used by the United States military. For aircraft no longer in service, see the list of military aircraft of the United States.

Army 

|-
! Type
! Manufacturer
! Origin
! Propulsion
! Role
! Control
! Introduced
! data-sort-type="number" | In service
! data-sort-type="number" | Total
! Notes
|-
| CL-650 (ARTEMIS)
| Bombardier
| Canada
| Jet
| Intelligence, Surveillance and Reconnaissance
| Manned
| 2020
| 2
| 2
| Modified CL-650; N488CR c/n 6140, N9191 c/n 5312
|-
| C-12J
| Beechcraft
| USA
| Propeller
| Transport
| Manned
| 1984
| 3
|
|
|-
| C-12 Huron
| Beechcraft
| USA
| Propeller
| Cargo/Transport
| Manned
| 1972
| 93
|
| C-12D, C-12R, C-12U, and C-12V
|-
| C-41 Aviocar
| CASA
| Spain
| Propeller
| Cargo/Transport
| Manned
| 1974
| 5
|
|
|- 
| C-26E Metroliner
| Fairchild
| USA
| Propeller
| Cargo/Transport
| Manned
| 1980s
| 12
|
|
|- 
| C-27J Spartan
| Alenia Aeronautica
| USAItaly
| Propeller
| Cargo aircraft
| Manned
| 2006
| 7
|
| Former Air Force aircraft used by Army Special Operations Command for training.
|-
| C-31A Troopship
| Fokker
| Netherlands
| Propeller
| Cargo/Transport
| Manned
| 1958
| 2
|
| Used for the Golden Knights Gold Team and Black Team
|- 
| C-20H
| Gulfstream
| USA
| Jet
| VIP Transport
| Manned
| 1985
| 1
|
| 
|-
| EO-5
| de Havilland Canada
| Canada
| Propeller
| Electronic Warfare,Reconnaissance
| Manned
| 1975
| 10
|
| 3 x EO-5C, 7 x RC-7. Previously designated as RC-7B
|-
| RC-12
| Beechcraft
| USA
| Propeller
| Reconnaissance
| Manned
| 1974
| 83
|
| RC-12D, RC-12H and RC-12K
|-
| UC-35
| Cessna
| USA
| Jet
| Utility aircraft
| Manned
| 1987
| 27
|
| 20 x UC-35A, 7 x UC-35B
|-
| C-37
| Gulfstream
| USA
| Jet
| VIP Transport
| Manned
| 1997
| 3
|
| 1 x C-37B (G550)(04-1778), 2 x C-37A (G500)(02-1863, 05–1944)
|- 
| RO-6A
| de Havilland Canada
| Canada
| Propeller
| Patrol
| Manned
| 1983
| 6
|
| Intelligence, Surveillance and Reconnaissance
|-
| UV-18C
| de Havilland Canada
| Canada
| Propeller
| Cargo/Transport
| Manned
| 1965
| 3
|
| Used for the Golden Knights Gold Team
|-
| MH/AH-6M Little Bird
| MD Helicopter
| USA
| Helicopter
| Attack
| Manned
| 1980
| 47
|
|
|- 
| AH-64 Apache Longbow, Guardian
| Boeing
| USA
| Helicopter
| Attack
| Manned
| 1986
| 792
|
| AH-64D and AH-64E. 25 on order as of December 2015. To be replaced by Future Long-Range Assault Aircraft.
|-
| CH-47F Chinook
| Boeing
| USA
| Helicopter
| Transport
| Manned
| 1962
| 442
|
| 394 x CH-47D, 48 x CH-47F. 464 new CH-47F to be delivered. To be replaced by Future Heavy Lift.
|- 
| EH-60A Black Hawk
| Sikorsky
| USA
| Helicopter
| Electronic-warfare
| Manned
| 1979
| 64
|
| 
|-
| MH-47 Chinook
| Boeing
| USA
| Helicopter
| Multi-mission
| Manned
| 1962
| 61
|
| 11 x MH-47D, 23 x MH-47E, 27 x MH-47G
|- 
| MH-60 Black Hawk
| Sikorsky
| USA
| Helicopter
| Multi-mission
| Manned
| 1979
| 58
|
| 23 x MH-60K, 35 x MH-60L.
|- 
| UH-60 Black Hawk
| Sikorsky
| USA
| Helicopter
| Utility
| Manned
| 1979
| 1,443
| 
| 751 x UH-60A, 592 x UH-60L, 100 x UH-60M. 1227 UH-60M planned. UH-60A and UH-60L models being upgraded and converted UH-60V. To be replaced by Future Long-Range Assault Aircraft.
|-
| UH-72A Lakota
| Eurocopter
| USAGermany
| Helicopter
| Utility
| Manned
| 2007
| 341
|
| 13 on order as of December 2015.
|-
| MQ-1C Gray Eagle
| General Atomics
| USA
| Propeller
| 
| Unmanned
| 2009
| 75
|
| 133 planned
|-
| Prioria Robotics Maveric 
| Prioria Robotics
| USA
| Propeller
| 
| Unmanned
| 2008
| 36 
|
| 
|-
| CQ-10 Snowgoose 
| MMIST
| Canada
| Propeller
| Transport
| Unmanned
| 2005 
| 15 
|
| 49 planned. Parafoil and autogyro variants.
|-
| RQ-7B Shadow 
| AAI Corporation
| USA
| Propeller
|
| Unmanned
| 2002
| 450
|
| 68 on order.
|-
| RQ-11 Raven 
| AeroVironment
| USA
| Propeller
| 
| Unmanned
| 2003
| 
|
| 
|-
| RQ-20 Puma 
| AeroVironment
| USA
| Propeller
| Patrol
| Unmanned
| 2008
|
| 
| 
|}

Marine Corps 

|-
! Type
! Manufacturer
! Origin
! Propulsion
! Role
! Control
! Introduced
! In service
! Total
! Notes
|-
| C-20G
| Gulfstream
| USA
| Jet
| Cargo/Transport aircraft
| Manned
| 1985
| 2
| 2 
| Will be upgraded to C-20 ER
|-
| F/A-18A Hornet
| McDonnell Douglas
| USA
| Jet
| Carrier-based Fighter
| Manned
| 1985
| 36 Active, 7 Training, 12 Stored
| 55
| Scheduled to be replaced by F-35B/C Lightning II by 2019
|-
| F/A-18B Hornet
| McDonnell Douglas
| USA
| Jet
| Carrier-based Trainer
| Manned
| 1985
| 4 Training, 3 Stored
| 7
| Scheduled to be replaced by F-35B/C Lightning II by 2019.
|-
| F/A-18C Hornet
|McDonnell Douglas
| USA
| Jet
| Carrier-based Fighter
| Manned
| 1985
| 60 Active, 12 Training, 47 Stored
| 119
| Scheduled to begin replacement by F-35B/C Lightning II starting 2019.
|-
| F/A-18D Hornet
| McDonnell Douglas
| USA
| Jet
| Carrier-based Strike
| Manned
| 1985
| 48 Active, 20 Training, 24 Stored
| 92
| Scheduled to begin replacement by F-35B/C Lightning II starting 2023.
|- 
| F-35B Lightning II
| Lockheed Martin
| USA
| Jet
| Carrier-based Fighter
| Manned
| 2015
| 32 Active, 25 Training
| 57
| V/STOL variant. Planned total of 353 F-35Bs and 67 F-35Cs (CTOL) to replace various aircraft.
|-
| F-5N Tiger II
| Northrop
| USA
| Jet
| Aggressor
| Manned
| 1959
| 12
| 
| Scheduled to maintain service till 2026.
|- 
| KC-130J Super Hercules
| Lockheed Martin
| USA
| Propeller
| Aerial refueling
| Manned
| 1962
| 52
|
|
|- 
| UC-12W Huron
| Beechcraft
| USA
| Propeller
| Utility
| Manned
| 1974
| 8
| 8
| Scheduled to replace the UC-12F/M Huron by 2024.
|-
| UC-12M Huron
| Beechcraft
| USA
| Propeller
| Utility
| Manned
| 1974
| 2
| 2
| Scheduled to be replaced by UC-12W Huron by 2024.
|-
| UC-12F Huron
| Beechcraft
| USA
| Propeller
| Utility
| Manned
| 1974
| 4
| 4
| Scheduled to be replaced by UC-12W Huron by 2024.
|-
| UC-35D Citation
| Cessna
| USA
| Jet
| Utility
| Manned
| 1972
| 10 Active
| 10
| To be replaced/upgraded to UC-35 ER.
|- 
| UC-35C Citation
| Cessna
| USA
| Jet
| Utility
| Manned
| 1972
| 2 Active
| 2
| To be replaced/upgraded to UC-35 ER.
|- 
| AH-1Z Viper
| Bell
| USA
| Helicopter
| Attack
| Manned
| 2010
| 90
| 
| 189 planned in total
|- 
| CH-53E Super Stallion
| Sikorsky
| USA
| Helicopter
| Cargo/Transport
| Manned
| 1981
| 96 Active, 6 Reserve, 10 Training
| 142
| To be replaced by CH-53K King Stallion, in flight testing - 2015.
|- 
| UH-1Y Venom
| Bell
| USA
| Helicopter
| Utility
| Manned
| 2008
| 122
| 160
| 
|- 
| VH-3D Sea King
| Sikorsky
| USA
| Helicopter
| Marine One VIP Transport
| Manned
| 1961
| 11
| 
| To be replaced by Sikorsky VH-92A
|- 
| VH-60N Whitehawk
| Sikorsky
| USA
| Helicopter
| Marine One VIP Transport
| Manned
| 1979
| 8
| 
| To be replaced by Sikorsky VH-92A
|- 
| AV-8B/+ Harrier II
| McDonnell Douglas
| US / UK
| Jet
| Attack/Trainer
| Manned
| 1985
| 80 Active, 13 training, 4 test aircraft
| 97
| VTOL. To be replaced by F-35B
|- 
| MV-22B Osprey
| Bell Boeing
| USA
| Tiltrotor
| Multi-mission
| Manned
| 2007
| 236
| 300
| VTOL. 360 on order
|-
| K-MAX 
| Kaman
| USA
| Helicopter
| Cargo and transport
| Unmanned
| 1991
| 1
| 
| Helicopter with twin intermeshing rotors. UAV variant of manned type.
|-
| RQ-7B Shadow 
| AAI Corporation
| USA
| Propeller
| Reconnaissance 
| Unmanned
| 2002
| 50
| 
| 
|-
| RQ-11 Raven 
| AeroVironment
| USA
| Propeller
| Reconnaissance 
| Unmanned
| 2003
| 
| 
| 
|-
| MQ-27
| Boeing
| USA
| Propeller
| Reconnaissance 
| Unmanned
| 2005
| 
| 
| 
|-
| RQ-20 Puma 
| AeroVironment
| USA
| Propeller
| Reconnaissance 
| Unmanned
| 2008
| 
| 
| 
|-
| RQ-21A Blackjack
| Boeing Insitu
| USA
| Propeller
| Reconnaissance 
| Unmanned
| 2014
| 
| 
| 
|- 
| MQ-8B Fire Scout 
| Northrop Grumman
| USA
| Helicopter
| Multi-Mission 
| Unmanned 
| 2009 
| 27
| 
|
|- 
| Black Hornet Nano 
| Prox Dynamics
| Norway
| Helicopter
| 
| Unmanned
| 2015 
| 
|
|
|-
| MQ-9 Reaper
| General Atomics
| USA
| Propeller
| Reconnaissance 
| Unmanned
| 2023
| 
|8 
| Scheduled to 2023. 
|}
"In service" sources:

Navy 

|-
! Type
! Manufacturer
! Origin
! Propulsion
! Role
! Control
! Introduced
! In service
! Total
! Notes
|-
| C-2A Greyhound
| Grumman
| USA
| Propeller
| Carrier-based Cargo/Transport aircraft
| Manned
| 1966
| 33
| 
| To be replaced by 44 CMV-22
|-
| C-20
| Gulfstream
| USA
| Jet
| Cargo/Transport aircraft
| Manned
| 1985
| 4
| 
| C-20G
|- 
| C-37
| Gulfstream 
| USA
| Jet
| Cargo/Transport aircraft
| Manned
| 1997
| 4
| 
| 1 x C-37A
|-
| C-40A Clipper
| Boeing
| USA
| Jet
| Cargo/Transport aircraft
| Manned
| 2001
| 17
| 
|
|- 
| C-130T Hercules
| Lockheed
| USA
| Propeller
| Cargo/Transport aircraft
| Manned
| 1956
| 15
| 
|
|-
| UC-12 Huron
| Beechcraft
| USA
| Propeller
| Cargo/Transport aircraft
| Manned
| 1974
| 14
|
| 
|-
| C-26D Metroliner
| Fairchild
| USA
| Propeller
| Cargo/Transport aircraft
| Manned
| 1980s
| 6
| 
|
|-
| KC-130T
| Lockheed Martin
| USA
| Propeller
| Aerial Refueling
| Manned
| 1962
| 5
| 
|
|- 
| E-2C/D Hawkeye
| Northrop Grumman
| USA
| Propeller
| Carrier-based Airborne Command and Control aircraft
| Manned
| 1963
| 81
| 
| 
|-
| E-6B Mercury
| Boeing
| USA
| Jet
| TACAMO
| Manned
| 1989
| 16 
| 
|
|-  
| EA-18G Growler
| Boeing
| USA
| Jet
| Carrier-based Electronic-warfare aircraft
| Manned
| 2009
| 155
| 
|
|-
| EP-3E ARIES II
| Lockheed
| USA
| Propeller
| Electronic-warfare aircraft
| Manned
| 1950s
| 12
| 
|
|- 
| F-5F/N Tiger II
| Northrop
| USA
| Jet
| Aggressor
| Manned
| 1962
| 29
| 
| F-5F, F-5N. Used for adversary training
|- 
| F-16 Fighting Falcon
| General Dynamics
| USA
| Jet
| Aggressor
| Manned
| 1978
| 14
| 
| Used for adversary training.
|- 
| F/A-18E/F Super Hornet
| McDonnell Douglas / Northrop Grumman / Boeing 
| USA
| Jet
| Carrier-based Fighter
| Manned
| 1999
| 512
| 
| F/A-18E and F/A-18F. 22 on order.  
|-
| F-35C Lightning II
| Lockheed Martin
| USA
| Jet
| Carrier-based Fighter aircraft
| Manned
| 2015
| 118
| 
| 260 planned
|- 
| MQ-4C Triton
| Northrop Grumman
| USA
| Jet
| Unmanned aerial vehicle
| Unmanned
| 2018
| 2
|
| 68 Planned
|-
| P-3C Orion
| Lockheed
| USA
| Propeller
| Maritime patrol aircraft
| Manned
| 1962
| 37
| 
| To be replaced by P-8
|-
| P-8A Poseidon
| Boeing
| USA
| Jet
| Anti-Submarine-warfare aircraft
| Manned
| 2013
| 91
| 
| 24 on order
|- 
| T-6 Texan II
| Beechcraft
| USA
| Propeller
| Trainer aircraft
| Manned
| 2001
| 294
| 
| 29 on order.
|-
| T-44A
| Beechcraft
| USA
| Propeller
| Trainer aircraft
| Manned
| 1964
| 57
| 
|
|- 
| T-45C Goshawk
| McDonnell Douglas
| UK/USA
| Jet
| Carrier-based Trainer aircraft
| Manned
| 1991
| 194
| 
|
|-
| UC-35D
| Cessna
| USA
| Jet
| Utility aircraft
| Manned
| 1972
| 1
| 
|
|-
| CMV-22 Osprey
| Bell Boeing
| USA
| Tiltrotor
| Multi-mission
| Manned
| 2007
| 1
| 
| 48 on order.
|-
| MH-53E Sea Dragon
| Sikorsky
| USA
| Helicopter
| Airborne mine countermeasures and vertical on-board delivery
| Manned
| 1981
| 27
| 
|
|- 
| MH-60 Seahawk
| Sikorsky
| USA
| Helicopter
| Anti-submarine warfare helicopterMulti-mission
| Manned
| 1984
| 508
| 
| 
|- 
| TH-57B/C Sea Ranger
| Bell
| USA
| Helicopter
| Trainer
| Manned
| 1984
| 114
| 
| To be replaced by the AgustaWestland TH-57A Thrasher
|- 
| ScanEagle
| Boeing
| USA
| Propeller
| 
| Unmanned
| 2005
|
| 
| 
|-
| RQ-21A Blackjack
| Boeing Insitu
| USA
| Propeller
| 
| Unmanned
| 2014
| 
| 
| 
|- 
| MQ-8B Fire Scout 
| Northrop Grumman
| USA
| Helicopter
| Patrol 
| Unmanned
| 2009
| 27
| 
| Helicopter. 96 planned.
|}

Air Force 

|-
! Aircraft
! Manufacturer
! Origin
! Propulsion
! Role
! Control
! Introduced
! data-sort-type="number" | In service
! Total
! Notes
|-
| A-10C Thunderbolt II
| Fairchild Republic
| USA
| Jet
| CAS / Attack
| Manned
| 1977
| 281
| 
|
|- 
| AC-130J Ghostrider
| Lockheed
| USA
| Propeller
| CAS / Attack
| Manned
| 2017
| 6
|
| Replacement for the AC-130U. 
|- 
| AC-130W Stinger II
| Lockheed
| USA
| Propeller
| CAS / Attack
| Manned
| 1966
| 20
| 
| Currently being replaced by the AC-130J.
|- 
| B-1B Lancer
| Rockwell International
| USA
| Jet
| Bomber
| Manned
| 1986
| 45
| 
| Employs variable-sweep wing design. To be replaced by the B-21 Raider.
|- 
| B-2A Spirit
| Northrop Grumman
| USA
| Jet
| Bomber
| Manned
| 1997
| 19
| 
| Stealth capable aircraft. To be replaced by the B-21 Raider.
|-
| B-52H Stratofortress
| Boeing
| USA
| Jet
| Bomber
| Manned
| 1955
| 74
| 
| 2 retired B52H being reactivated to replace damaged aircraft and return fleet size to 76.
|- 
| C-5M Super Galaxy
| Lockheed
| USA
| Jet
| Strategic airlifter
| Manned
| 1970
| 52
| 
| 
|-
| C-12C/D/H/J Huron
| Beechcraft
| USA
| Propeller
| Transport
| Manned
| 1972 
| 55
| 
| 32 aircraft are used for reconnaissance 
|- 
| C-17A Globemaster III
| McDonnell Douglas/Boeing
| USA
| Jet
| Strategic airlifter
| Manned
| 1995
| 222
| 
| Were produced by McDonnell-Douglas prior to the merger with Boeing. 
|- 
| C-21A Learjet 35
| Learjet
| USA
| Jet
| VIP transport
| Manned
| 1985
| 18
| 
|
|-
| C-32A/B Air Force Two
| Boeing
| USA
| Jet
| VIP transport
| Manned
| 1998
| 6
| 
| 
|- 
| C-37A/B Gulfstream V
| Gulfstream
| USA
| Jet
| VIP transport
| Manned
| 1998
| 11
| 
|
|-
| C-40B/C
| Boeing
| USA
| Jet
| VIP transport
| Manned
| 2001
| 11
| 
| 
|-
| C-130H Hercules
| Lockheed Martin
| USA
| Propeller
| Tactical airlifter
| Manned
| 1956
| 192
| 
| 
|- 
| C-130J Super Hercules
| Lockheed Martin
| USA
| Propeller
| Tactical airlifter
| Manned
| 1996
| 132
| 
| 
|- 
| C-145A Skytruck
| PZL Mielec
| Poland
| Propeller
| Utility
| Manned
| 2007
| 5
|
| Assigned to the 6th Special Operations Squadron
|- 
| C-146A Wolfhound
| Fairchild-Dornier
| Germany
| Propeller
| Transport
| Manned
| 2011
| 20
| 
| Flown with the 524th Special Operations Squadron
|- 
| CN-235
| CASA
| Spain
| Propeller
| Reconnaissance
| Manned
| 1988
| 5
| 
| Flown with the 427th Special Operations Squadron
|- 
| CV-22B Osprey
| Bell, Boeing
| USA
| Tiltrotor
| CSAR / transport 
| Manned
| 2006
| 50
| 
| 
|- 
| E-3B/C/G Sentry (AWACS)
| Boeing
| USA
| Jet
| AWACS
| Manned
| 1977
| 31
| 
| 
|- 
| E-4B (NAOC)
| Boeing
| USA
| Jet
| Command and control
| Manned
| 1973
| 4
| 
| Assigned to the 595th Command and Control Group 
|- 
| E-8C Joint STARS
| Northrop Grumman
| USA
| Jet
| Command and control
| Manned
| 1996
| 16
| 
| 
|- 
| E-9A Widget
| De Havilland Canada
| Canada
| Propeller
| Surveillance
| Manned
| 1984
| 3
| 
|
|- 
| E-11A (BACN)
| Northrop Grumman
| USA / Canada
| Jet
| Command and control / BACN
| Manned
| 2005
| 4
| 
|
|- 
| EC-130H Compass Call
| Lockheed Martin
| USA
| Propeller
| Radar jamming / PSYOP
| Manned
| 1982
| 12
|
| 
|- 
| EC-130J Commando Solo III
| Lockheed Martin
| USA
| Propeller
| Radar jamming / PSYOP
| Manned
| 1978
| 7
| 
| 
|- 
| F-15C/D Eagle
| McDonnell Douglas
| USA
| Jet
| Air superiority
| Manned
| 1976
| 234
| 1500
| 26 D variants are used for training. To be retired by 2030.
|- 
| F-15E Strike Eagle
| McDonnell Douglas/Boeing
| USA
| Jet
| Multirole, primarily strike
| Manned
| 1988
| 218
| 
| 
|- 
| F-15EX Eagle II
| McDonnell Douglas/Boeing
| USA
| Jet
| Multirole, primarily strike
| Manned
| 2020
| 8
| 
| F-15C/D Eagle replacement 
|-
| F-16C/D Fighting Falcon
| General Dynamics
| USA
| Jet
| Multirole
| Manned
| 1978
| 934
| 4000
| 
|- 
| F-22A Raptor
| Lockheed Martin
| USA
| Jet
| Air superiority
| Manned
| 2005
| 186
| 
| Stealth capable aircraft. To be replaced by NGAD
|- 
| F-35A Lightning II
| Lockheed Martin
| USA
| Jet
| Multirole
| Manned
| 2016
| 283
| 
| Stealth capable aircraft. F-16 replacement
|- 
| HC-130J Combat King II
| Lockheed Martin
| USA
| Propeller
| Search and rescue
| Manned
| 1959
| 32
| 
| 
|-
| HH-60G/U Pave Hawk
| Sikorsky
| USA
| Helicopter
| CSAR
| Manned
| 2016
| 106
| 
| To be replaced by the HH-60W Jolly Green II
|-  
| KC-10A Extender
| McDonnell Douglas
| USA
| Jet
| Aerial refueling
| Manned
| 1981
| 59
| 
| 
|- 
| KC-46A Pegasus
| Boeing
| USA
| Jet
| Aerial refueling
| Manned
| 2019
| 23
| 
| 38 on order
|- 
| KC-135R/T Stratotanker
| Boeing
| USA
| Jet
| Aerial refueling
| Manned
| 1957
| 396
| 
| 
|-
| LC-130H Hercules
| Lockheed Martin
| USA
| Propeller
| Cargo aircraft
| Manned
| 1954
| 10
| 
| Assigned to 109th Airlift Wing
|- 
| MC-12W Liberty
| Beechcraft
| USA
| Propeller
| Multi-mission/Special Operations
| Manned
| 1974
| 13
| 
| 
|- 
| MC-130H Combat Talon II
| Lockheed Martin
| USA
| Propeller
| Multi-mission/Special Operations
| Manned
| 1966
| 16
| 
| 
|-
| MQ-9A Reaper 
| General Atomics
| USA
| Propeller
| Multi-mission
| Unmanned
| 2006
| 251
| 
| 
|-
| NC-135W
| Boeing
| USA
| Jet
| Test Bed
| Manned
| 1961
| 1
| 
|
|-
| OC-135B Open Skies
| Boeing
| USA
| Jet
| Observation
| Manned
| 1993
| 2
| 
| Used as part of Treaty on Open Skies
|- 
| RC-26B Metroliner
| Fairchild
| USA
| Propeller
| Reconnaissance
| Manned
| 1989
| 11
| 
| Used by Air National Guard for Drug Interdiction and Disaster Reconnaissance
|- 
| RC-135S Cobra Ball
| Boeing
| USA
| Jet
| Reconnaissance
| Manned
| 1972
| 3
| 
| 
|-
| RC-135U/V/W Combat Sent/Rivet Joint
| Boeing
| USA
| Jet
| ELINT / surveillance
| Manned
| 1972
| 22
| 
| 
|-
| RQ-4B Global Hawk 
| Northrop Grumman
| USA
| Jet
| Patrol
| Unmanned
| 2001
| 37
|
| 
|-
| RQ-20 Puma 
| AeroVironment
| USA
| Propeller
| Patrol
| Unmanned
| 2008
|
| 1000
| 
|- 
| RQ-170 Sentinel 
| Lockheed Martin
| USA
| Jet
| Multi-Mission
| Unmanned
| 2007
|
| 20-30
| 
|-
| T-1A Jayhawk
| Raytheon
| USA
| Jet
| Trainer
| Manned
| 1992
| 176
| 
| Multi-engine trainer 
|- 
| T-6A Texan II
| Raytheon/Beechcraft
| USA
| Propeller
| Trainer
| Manned
| 2001
| 446
| 
|
|-
| T-38A/C Talon
| Northrop
| USA
| Jet
| Trainer
| Manned
| 1961
| 505
| 
| 
|- 
| T-41D Mescalero
| Cessna
| USA
| Propeller
| Basic trainer
| Manned
| 1964
| 4
| 
| 
|- 
| T-51A Cessna
| Cessna
| USA
| Propeller
| Basic trainer
| Manned
| 1957
| 3
| 
| 
|- 
| T-53A Kadet II
| Cirrus
| USA
| Propeller
| Basic trainer
| Manned
| 1995
| 24
| 
| 
|- 
| TC-135W
| Boeing
| USA
| Jet
| Trainer
| Manned
| 1961
| 3
| 
| 
|- 
| TE-8A Joint STARS
| Northrop Grumman
| USA
| Jet
| Trainer
| Manned
| 1991
| 1
| 
| 
|- 
| TH-1H Iroquois
| Bell
| USA
| Helicopter
| Trainer
| Manned
| 1959
| 40
|
|
|-
| TU-2S Dragon Lady
| Lockheed
| USA
| Jet
| Conversion trainer 
| Manned
| 1957
| 4
| 
| 
|- 
| U-2S Dragon Lady
| Lockheed
| USA
| Jet
| Reconnaissance
| Manned
| 1957
| 26
| 
| 
|-
| U-28A Draco
| Pilatus
| Switzerland
| Propeller
| Utility
| Manned
| 1991
| 35
| 
| 23 used for reconnaissance
|- 
| UH-1N Twin Huey
| Bell
| USA
| Helicopter
| Utility
| Manned
| 1969
| 65
| 
| To be replaced by the MH-139 Grey Wolf
|-
| UV-18B Twin Otter
| De Havilland Canada 
| Canada
| Propeller
| Utility
| Manned
| 1988
| 1
| 
| STOL capable aircraft
|- 
| VC-25A Air Force One
| Boeing
| USA
| Jet
| VIP Transport
| Manned
| 1990
| 2
| 
| Presidential Transport, operated by 89th Airlift Wing
|- 
| WC-130J Hercules
| Lockheed Martin
| USA
| Propeller
| Weather reconnaissance
| Manned
| 1996
| 10
| 
| Assigned to 403d Wing 
|- 
| WC-135C/W Constant Phoenix
| Boeing
| USA
| Jet
| Atmospheric research
| Manned
| 1993
| 2
| 
|
|
|}
"In service" sources:

Coast Guard 

|-
! Type
! Manufacturer
! Origin
! Propulsion
! Role
! Control
! Introduced
! In service
! Total
! Notes
|-
| HC-27J Spartan
| Alenia Aeronautica
| USAItaly
| Propeller
| Search and rescue
| Manned
| 2006
| 14
|
| Former Air Force aircraft, acquired in return for the release of seven HC-130H aircraft to the United States Forest Service for use as aerial tankers.
|-
| C-37A
| Gulfstream
| USA
| Jet
| VIP transport
| Manned
| 1997
| 1
| 
| VIP transport for high-ranking members of the Department of Homeland Security and U.S. Coast Guard.
|-
| C-37B
| Gulfstream
| USA
| Jet
| VIP transport
| Manned
| 1997
| 1
| 
| VIP transport for high-ranking members of the Department of Homeland Security and U.S. Coast Guard.
|-
| HC-130H Hercules
| Lockheed Martin
| USA
| Propeller
| Search and rescue
| Manned
| 1959
| 14
| 
| Most have been removed from service and are being replaced by HC-130J aircraft. Seven were turned over to the United States Forest Service to be converted to aerial firefighting tankers.
|-
| HC-130J Hercules
| Lockheed Martin
| USA
| Propeller
| Search and rescue
| Manned
| 1959
| 12
|
| More on order, currently being manufactured to replace HC-130H.
|-
| HC-144A Ocean Sentry
| Airbus
| USASpain
| Propeller
| Search and rescue
| Manned
| 2009
| 15
| 
| 
|-
| HC-144B Minotaur
| Airbus
| USASpain
| Propeller
| Search and rescue
| Manned
| 2009
| 3
| 
| Minotaur upgrade of HC-144A aircraft includes advanced navigation and search and rescue equipment.
|-
| MH-60T Jayhawk
| Sikorsky
| USA
| Helicopter
| Medium Range Recovery (MRR)
| Manned
| 1990
| 42
| 
| Will remain in service until 2027
|- 
| MH-65D Dolphin
| Eurocopter
| USAFrance
| Helicopter
| Short Range Recovery (SRR)
| Manned
| 1985
| 95
| 
| 
|- 
| MH-65E Dolphin
| Eurocopter
| USAFrance
| Helicopter
| Short Range Recovery (SRR)
| Manned
| 1985
| 3
| 
| Upgraded version of MH-65D with advanced avionics and search and rescue equipment
|}
"In service" sources:

See also
United States Army Aviation Branch#Equipment
List of currently active United States naval aircraft
List of active United States Air Force aircraft
List of military aircraft of the United States
Future military aircraft of the United States
List of U.S. DoD aircraft designations
UAVs in the U.S. military
Fox (code word)

References

United States
United States Active Military Aircraft

United States military-related lists